Hebrew orthography includes three types of diacritics:
 Niqqud in Hebrew is the way to indicate vowels, which are omitted in modern orthography, using a set of ancillary glyphs. Since the vowels can be understood from surrounding, context can help readers read the correct pronunciations of several letters of the Hebrew alphabet (the rafe sign and other rare glyphs are also listed as part of the niqqud system but are not in common use);
 geresh and gershayim, two diacritics that are not considered a part of niqqud, each of which has several functions (e.g. to denote Hebrew numerals);
 and cantillation, "accents" which are used exclusively to indicate how Biblical passages should be chanted and may possess a punctuating function.

Several diacritical systems were developed in the Early Middle Ages. The most widespread system, and the only one still used to a significant degree today, was created by the Masoretes of Tiberias in the second half of the first millennium in the Land of Israel (see Masoretic Text, Tiberian Hebrew).
The Niqqud signs and cantillation marks developed by the Masoretes are small in size compared to consonants, so they could be added to the consonantal texts without retranscribing them.

Pointing (niqqud)

In modern Israeli orthography, vowel and consonant pointing is seldom used, except in specialised texts such as dictionaries, poetry, or texts for children or for new immigrants. Israeli Hebrew has five vowel phonemes—,  and —but many more written symbols for them.  Niqqud distinguish the following vowels and consonants; for more detail, see the main article.

Note 1: The symbol "ס" represents whatever Hebrew letter is used.
Note 2: The letter "ש" is used since it can only be represented by that letter.
Note 3: The dagesh, mappiq, and shuruk are different, however, they look the same and are inputted in the same manner. Also, they are represented by the same Unicode character.
Note 4: The letter "ו" is used since it can only be represented by that letter.

Vowel comparison table

Notes:
 [1] : These vowels lengths are not manifested in Modern Hebrew.
 [2] : Adding two vertical dots (sh'va) to the "short-vowel" diacritic produces the diacritic for "very short vowel".
 [3] : The short  and long  are represented by the same diacritic.
 [4] : The short  is usually promoted to a long  (holam male, vav with dot above) in Israeli writing for the sake of disambiguation.
 [5] : The short  is usually promoted to a long  (shuruk, vav with middle dot) in Israeli writing for the sake of disambiguation.

Meteg

Meteg is a vertical bar placed below a character next to the niqqud for various purposes, including marking vowel length and secondary stress. Its shape is identical to the cantillation mark sof pasuq.

Geresh

Geresh is a mark,  that may be used as a diacritic, as a punctuation mark for initialisms, or as a marker of Hebrew numerals. It is also used in cantillation.

As a diacritic, the geresh is combined with the following consonants:

Cantillation

Cantillation has a more limited use than vowel pointing, as it is only used for reciting the Tanakh, and is not found in children's books or dictionaries.

Gershayim

Gershayim between the penultimate and last letters (   e.g. ) marks acronyms, alphabetic numerals, names of Hebrew letters, linguistic roots and, in older texts, transcriptions of foreign words. Placed above a letter (  e.g. ) it is one of the cantillation marks.

Disputes among Protestant Christians
Protestant literalists who believe that the Hebrew text of the Old Testament is the inspired Word of God are divided on the question of whether or not the vowel points should be considered an inspired part of the Old Testament. In 1624, Louis Cappel, a French Huguenot scholar at Saumur, published a work in which he concluded that the vowel points were a later addition to the biblical text and that the vowel points were added not earlier than the fifth century AD. This assertion was hotly contested by Swiss theologian Johannes Buxtorf II in 1648. Brian Walton's 1657 polyglot bible followed Cappel in revising the vowel points. In 1675, the 2nd and 3rd canons of the so-called Helvetic Consensus of the Swiss Reformed Church confirmed Buxtorf's view as orthodox and affirmed that the vowel points were inspired.

Torah scrolls in Jewish synagogues do not have any diacritical marks whatsoever, only the letters themselves. It is expected of anyone reading out-loud to know the correct intonations.

See also
 Arabic diacritics
 Q're perpetuum
 Hebrew alphabet
 Hebrew spelling

Notes
* The rafe sign which is used to mark fricative consonants in the YIVO orthography of Yiddish; is no longer used in modern printed Hebrew. Rafe may appear in masoretic manuscripts as well as other older texts where the soft fricative consonants and sometimes matres lectionis are indicated by this sign.

References

External links
A free online course to learn the Hebrew Vowel System
Rules for Spelling without Niqqud - a simplified version of the Rules, published on the Academy of the Hebrew Language website.
Hebrew tutorial on how to use diacritics in Word